Lucas-Jordan Jeremiah Akins (born 25 February 1989) is an English professional footballer who plays for EFL League Two club Mansfield Town. Akins has been deployed in every outfield position during his career, mostly playing as either a winger or striker.

Akins started his career at Huddersfield Town, progressing through the club's youth academy before making his first-team debut in April 2007. During the 2007–08 season, he was loaned out to Conference Premier club Northwich Victoria for three months. He was released by Huddersfield in the summer of 2008, having made six first-team appearances during his time there. Akins then joined SPL club Hamilton Academical on a two-year deal in July 2008. In January 2009, he was loaned out to Partick Thistle for the remainder of the 2008–09 season in order to gain more match experience.

During the following season, he did not play for Hamilton, and was released when his contract expired in May 2010. He subsequently signed for League One club Tranmere Rovers on a free transfer, playing regularly for two seasons. In August 2012, Akins joined Stevenage for an undisclosed fee and spent two seasons there. He signed for Burton Albion in July 2014 and helped the club earn back-to-back promotions from League Two into the Championship. Akins holds the club record for most appearances (305) and goals scored (65) for Burton in the English Football League. After eight years at Burton, Akins signed for Mansfield Town in January 2022.

Early life
Akins was born in Huddersfield. His mother originated from Grenada and his father from Carriacou. From the age of four, he took classes in several forms of dance, including ballet, jazz, and tap. At the age of 16, he ultimately opted to pursue a career in football, and stopped attending the dance classes. He attended Kirklees College where he studied sports science.

Club career

Huddersfield Town
Akins began his career with his hometown club, Huddersfield Town, finishing as the club's top goalscorer for the under-18 team for successive seasons. In April 2007, Huddersfield Town manager Andy Ritchie requested Akins train with the first-team following his "impressive" performances for both the academy and reserve teams. Towards the end of the 2006–07 season, Akins made his professional debut, replacing Luke Beckett as an 87th-minute substitute in a 1–1 draw against Northampton Town at Sixfields. He earned his first professional contract on 2 May 2007, signing a one-year deal with the club.

Ahead of the 2007–08 season, Akins played regularly in the club's pre-season friendlies, scoring in a victory over Mansfield Town a week before the start of the new season. He made four appearances during the first two months of the season, all of which were as a substitute. His appearance as a late substitute in a 4–0 defeat against Walsall on 6 October 2007 ultimately proved to be Akins' last game for the club. He was sent out on loan to Conference Premier club Northwich Victoria on 23 November 2007, joining the Cheshire team on an initial one-month loan agreement. A day after signing, on 24 November 2007, Akins started in Northwich's 1–0 home victory over Rushden & Diamonds, the club's first win in 19 games. Northwich remained unbeaten during his brief loan spell, and his loan deal was subsequently extended by a further month, which manager Dino Maamria described as a "massive boost" for the club. He scored his first professional goal in the following match, scoring with a shot from just inside the area as Northwich secured a 2–1 away win against rivals Altrincham on 26 December 2007. During his loan spell with Northwich, Akins made ten appearances, scoring once. He returned to Huddersfield in February 2008, although he made no further first-team appearances for the club.

Following Andy Ritchie's departure in April 2008, new Huddersfield manager Stan Ternent told Akins that he would not be offered a new deal when his contract expired in June that year. Akins was consequently released at the end of the season. During his time at Huddersfield, he made six appearances in all competitions.

Hamilton Academical
In July 2008, Akins went on trial with newly promoted SPL club Hamilton Academical, playing in a number of pre-season matches during the two-week period. He impressed Hamilton manager Billy Reid enough to earn a two-year contract with the club, signing on a free transfer on 22 July 2008. He went on to score four times in Hamilton's remaining four pre-season fixtures. Akins made his competitive debut for Hamilton in the first game of the new SPL season, coming on as a 67th-minute substitute in a 3–1 home victory over Dundee United at New Douglas Park. The victory successfully marked the end of Hamilton's 19-year exile from the top flight of Scottish football. Akins featured predominantly as a substitute during the first half of the season, with seven of his thirteen appearances coming from the substitutes' bench.

In January 2009, Hamilton manager Billy Reid stated his intention to loan out Akins in order for the player to gain more first-team experience. He subsequently signed for Scottish First Division club Partick Thistle on loan for the remainder of the 2008–09 season. He made his debut a day after joining the club, coming on as a late substitute in a 2–2 away draw Queen of the South. After the appearance, Akins did not play for two months, before returning as a second-half substitute in a 1–0 home defeat to Clyde in March 2009. He played regularly for Partick for the remainder of the season, making nine appearances, and scoring once in a 1–0 win against Greenock Morton on 18 April 2009. He returned to Hamilton at the end of the loan agreement, but ultimately played no part during the 2009–10 season. He was released by Hamilton in May 2010.

Tranmere Rovers
Following his release by Hamilton, Akins went on trial with Rochdale in July 2010, playing in the club's 2–0 pre-season friendly victory against Rossendale United. Whilst no transfer materialised, Akins stated he was grateful to Rochdale manager Keith Hill for taking him on the club's pre-season trip to Marbella, enabling him to gain fitness. Akins subsequently took up the offer of a two-week trial with League One club Tranmere Rovers later in the month. The trial proved to be successful, and Akins signed a one-year contract with the club on 24 August 2010. He made his Tranmere debut on the same day his transfer was announced, coming on as an 82nd-minute substitute in a 3–1 home loss to Swansea City in the League Cup. The season turned out to be Akins' first season of regular first-team football, making 38 appearances. He also scored two goals that season, both of which came in a 4–0 win over Exeter City on 25 April 2011. At the end of the season, in May 2011, Akins was offered a new one-year contract with the club. He ultimately signed the new deal, with the option of a further year, on 29 July 2011. On retaining Akins' services, Tranmere manager Les Parry stated – "I'm pleased to have sorted Lucas' contract out and glad he'll be part of our squad. He was a regular last season and his work ethic was fantastic".

He played in the club's opening game of the 2011–12 season, coming on as a late substitute in a 1–0 home victory against newly promoted Chesterfield. Akins scored his first goal of the season on 13 September 2011, scoring with a low right-footed shot in a 2–1 home defeat to Carlisle United. A month later, he scored both goals as Tranmere ran out 2–0 winners against Hartlepool United at Victoria Park. Akins played 49 times during the season, scoring five goals, as Tranmere finished the season in mid-table. Shortly after the club's last game of the season, Tranmere exercised the option to renew Akins' contract for a further year. During his two years at Tranmere, Akins made 87 appearances in all competitions, scoring seven goals.

Stevenage
Despite Tranmere activating the automatic contract extension clause at the end of the season, Akins handed in a transfer request in July 2012 amid speculation about a move to fellow League One club Stevenage. Tranmere rejected the request, with manager Ronnie Moore stating he had "no intention of letting Akins go. We have told them he's not going anywhere". However, on 2 August 2012, Akins signed for Stevenage for an undisclosed fee, on a three-year contract. He made his debut for Stevenage in the club's first game of the 2012–13 season, coming on as a 71st-minute substitute in a 3–1 home victory over AFC Wimbledon in the League Cup. Akins started his first game for Stevenage in his third appearance for the club, scoring the only goal of the game in a 1–0 away win over Leyton Orient on 21 August. Akins played in all 46 of Stevenage's league games during the season, making a further four appearances in cup competitions, and finished the season as the club's top goalscorer with ten goals.

Burton Albion
Despite having signed a new 12-month contract with Stevenage on 20 May 2014, Akins signed for League Two club Burton Albion on a two-year contract on 18 June 2014. He made his Burton debut in the club's opening match of the 2014–15 season, scoring the only goal of the game in a 1–0 away victory at Oxford United. Akins scored twice in Burton's 2–1 win at Morecambe on 18 April 2015; a victory that ultimately secured Burton's promotion into League One for the first time in their history. He made 38 appearances and was the club's top goalscorer with nine goals, as Burton finished the League Two season as champions. Akins opened the 2015–16 season by scoring the winning goal in Burton's first ever League One match, a 2–1 victory against Scunthorpe United at the Pirelli Stadium. He scored his first career hat-trick in a 3–0 away win at Colchester United on 23 April 2016. Burton earned back-to-back promotions into the Championship after finishing in second-place in League One, with Akins scoring 12 times in 48 appearances. Out of contract at the end of the season, Akins was offered a new contract by Burton in May 2016, signing a two-year extension on 30 June 2016.

For the third consecutive season, Akins scored in Burton's opening match of the season; this time scoring a first-half goal away at Nottingham Forest in an eventual 4–3 defeat to start the 2016–17 season. He scored five times in 41 appearances during a season in which he was deployed as a wing-back, winger and forward. Burton finished their first season in the second tier of English football in 20th place, thus remaining in the division for a further year. He signed a two-year contract extension on 25 April 2017, keeping him contracted to Burton until 2019. Akins played regularly during the 2017–18 season, making 46 appearances and scoring six times as Burton were relegated back to League One. He was named the club's Player of the Year at the end-of-season awards ceremony in May 2018. After Akins signed a three-year contract extension on 11 January 2019, Burton manager Nigel Clough stated there had been transfer interest from other clubs looking to recruit Akins, as well as describing him as "one of the best signings this club has ever made". Akins recorded his highest seasonal goal tally during the 2018–19 season, scoring 14 times in 56 matches, finishing as joint top goalscorer for the club that season. He was named as Burton's Player of the Year, meaning he had earned the award in successive seasons.

He scored his 50th goal for Burton in a 2–2 draw with Doncaster Rovers on 2 November 2019, and went on to score 11 times in 45 matches during the 2019–20 season. He attracted transfer interest from Mansfield Town in January 2021, managed by former Burton manager Nigel Clough, but Akins remained at Burton. Having played 47 times throughout the 2020–21 season in League One, scoring 11 goals, Akins holds the club record for most appearances and goals scored for Burton in the Football League.

Mansfield Town
Akins joined League Two club Mansfield Town on a two-and-a-half year deal on 20 January 2022, signing for an undisclosed fee. The move meant Akins was reunited with manager Nigel Clough, who had previously managed him at Burton.

International career
Akins was called up to represent the Grenada national football team in March 2020, qualifying to play for them through his ancestry, although the matches were ultimately cancelled due to the COVID-19 pandemic.

Style of play
Akins began his career playing as a striker, before being deployed as a winger. He is right-footed, but also comfortable using his left foot. Akins states his favoured position is as a forward. During his time at Burton Albion, he has been utilised in every outfield position, with his versatility being highlighted as a strength. During the 2017–18 season, Akins was predominantly used as a right wing-back, with his work ethic being praised in one of the most physically demanding positions in football. He stated he enjoyed playing there as he would find space when attacking against wingers who did not fulfil their defensive duties.

Career statistics

A.  The "League" column constitutes appearances and goals (including those as a substitute) in the Football League, Conference National, SPL, and Scottish First Division.
B.  The "Other" column constitutes appearances and goals (including those as a substitute) in the Football League Trophy and EFL League Two play-offs.

Honours
Burton Albion
League Two champions: 2014–15

Individual
Burton Albion Player of the Year: 2017–18, 2018–19

References

External links

1989 births
Living people
Footballers from Huddersfield
English sportspeople of Grenadian descent
English footballers
Huddersfield Town A.F.C. players
Northwich Victoria F.C. players
Hamilton Academical F.C. players
Partick Thistle F.C. players
Tranmere Rovers F.C. players
Stevenage F.C. players
Burton Albion F.C. players
Mansfield Town F.C. players
Association football forwards
English Football League players
National League (English football) players
Scottish Premier League players
Scottish Football League players